Code of the Cactus is a 1939 American Western film directed by Sam Newfield.

Cast 
Tim McCoy as "Lightning" Bill Carson / Miguel
Ben Corbett as Magpie
Dorothy Short as Joan
Ted Adams as Thurston
Stephen Chase as Foreman James
Dave O'Brien as Bob Swane
Forrest Taylor as Blackton
Bob Terry as Lefty, gang truck driver
Slim Whitaker as Sheriff Burton
Frank Wayne as Jake, gang truck shotgun

Soundtrack 
Art Davis - "Across The Boundary Line" (Written by Johnny Lange and Lew Porter)

External links 

1939 films
1930s English-language films
American black-and-white films
1939 Western (genre) films
American Western (genre) films
Films directed by Sam Newfield
1930s American films